Tiszaligeti Sportcsarnok is multifunctional indoor hall in Szolnok, Hungary. The arena is primarily used for basketball, as it is the home of Hungarian top division side Szolnoki Olaj KK and regularly hosts the matches of the Hungarian national basketball team. In the sports hall are organized other indoor sport events as well, such as futsal and volleyball matches, but it also welcomes non-sporting events, for example fairs, exhibitions and conferences.

The hall was built in 1975, but with time it started to become obsolete. To keep it a state-of-the-art arena, Tisztaligeti Sportcsarnok went through a complete renovation between 2001 and 2002 for 386 million Hungarian Forint (approximately US$1.75 million), and was re-opened on 23 March 2002.

References

Indoor arenas in Hungary
Basketball venues in Hungary
Volleyball venues in Hungary
Buildings and structures in Jász-Nagykun-Szolnok County